Daxing Township is a township under the administration of Gengma Dai and Va Autonomous County, Yunnan, China. , it has 6 villages under its administration.

References 

Township-level divisions of Lincang
Gengma Dai and Va Autonomous County